Justin Evans (born August 26, 1995) is an American football safety who is a free agent. He played college football at Texas A&M.

Professional career
Evans received an invitation to the Senior Bowl and was able to impress scouts during practice. He was unable to participate during the actual game due to injury. He attended the NFL Combine and only completed the bench press due to a quad injury. Evans also participated at Texas A&M's Pro Day and completed the majority of combine drills he was unable to finish at the combine. He opted to not run the short shuttle and three-cone drill. The majority of NFL draft experts and analysts projected Evans to be a second or third round pick. He was ranked the sixth best strong safety by DraftScout.com, the tenth best safety by Sports Illustrated,
and was ranked the ninth best safety in the draft by ESPN.

Tampa Bay Buccaneers

The Tampa Bay Buccaneers selected Evans in the second round (50th overall) of the 2017 NFL Draft. Evans was the seventh safety drafted in 2017. On May 25, 2017, Evans signed a four-year, $5.19 million contract with the team.

2017
Throughout training camp, Evans competed to be a starting safety against J. J. Wilcox, Chris Conte, and Keith Tandy.

He made his professional regular season debut in the Tampa Bay Buccaneers against the Chicago Bears and made one solo tackle during a 29–7 victory. On October 5, 2017, Evans earned his first career start after Keith Tandy sustained a hip injury. Evans collected a season-high nine combined tackles, deflected two passes, and made his first career interception during a 19–14 loss against the New England Patriots in Week 5 on Monday Night Football. He intercepted a pass by Patriots’ quarterback Tom Brady, that was initially intended for wide receiver Chris Hogan, and returned it for a two-yard gain on the first drive of the game. In Week 15, Evans recorded six combined tackles and sustained an ankle injury during a 24–21 loss against the Atlanta Falcons. On December 20, 2017, the Tampa Bay Buccaneers placed Evans on injured reserve due to an ankle injury. Evans finished his rookie season in 2017 with 66 combined tackles (50 solo), six pass deflections, and three interceptions in 14 games and 11 starts.

2018–2020
Evans entered training camp slated as a starting safety, but saw competition from Chris Conte, Keith Tandy, and Jordan Whitehead. Head coach Dirk Koetter named Evans and Chris Conte the starting safeties to begin the regular season in 2018.

He started in the Tampa Bay Buccaneers’ season-opener at the New Orleans Saints and made five combined tackles and returned a fumble recovery for a 34-yard touchdown during a 48–40 victory. Evans recovered a fumble and returned it for a 34-yard touchdown during the second quarter after teammate Vernon Hargreaves forced the fumble by Saints’ running back Mike Gillislee. On September 24, 2018, Evans made six combined tackles, a pass deflection, and an interception during a 30–27 loss against the Pittsburgh Steelers in Week 3. Evans sustained a toe injury in Week 10 and missed the next two games (Weeks 11–12). In Week 10, he collected a season-high nine combined tackles during a 16–3 loss against the Washington Redskins. On December 2, 2018, Evans recorded two solo tackles during a 24–17 win against the Carolina Panthers in Week 13, but was carted off the field in the second quarter after aggravating his toe injury. He missed the next two games (Weeks 14–15) before he was placed on injured reserve on December 18, 2018. He finished the 2018 NFL season with 59 combined tackles (43 solo), two pass deflections, one interception, a fumble recovery, and one touchdown. He received an overall grade of 67.7 from Pro Football Focus, which ranked as the 52nd best grade among all qualified safeties in 2018.

On September 10, 2019, Evans was placed on injured reserve with an Achilles injury. He was placed on the active/physically unable to perform list (PUP) at the start of training camp on July 28, 2020. He was moved to the reserve/PUP list at the start of the regular season on September 5, 2020. On December 22, 2020, Evans was waived by the Buccaneers with a "failed physical" designation.

New Orleans Saints
On April 4, 2022, after missing the 2021 season, Evans signed a one-year contract with the New Orleans Saints.

References

External links
Texas A&M Aggies bio

1995 births
Living people
American football safeties
Texas A&M Aggies football players
Tampa Bay Buccaneers players
Players of American football from Mississippi
People from Wiggins, Mississippi
New Orleans Saints players